Hitsville USA: The Motown Singles Collection Volume 2 1972–1992 is a 1993 four-disc collection of Motown hits that were released after the original Motown studios relocated to Los Angeles. The box set was preceded the previous year by Hitsville USA: The Motown Singles Collection 1959–1971.

Track listing

References

1993 compilation albums
Motown compilation albums
Soul compilation albums
Pop compilation albums
Rhythm and blues compilation albums
Record label compilation albums